ICPA may stand for:
 International Corrections and Prisons Association, an international nonprofit association for criminal justice professionals to share ideas and practices aimed at advancing professional corrections
 Internet Community Ports Act, proposed but not introduced U.S. federal legislation on content filtering
 International Certificate for Piano Artists, an international certification programme for pianists